Monsters of Rock was a tribute band formed in San Diego, California, USA in March 2005.
They were billed as "San Diego's Ultimate Metal Tribute Band."

Background

Monsters of Rock were a San Diego-based multi-metal tribute act dedicated to performing the songs of the well-known metal bands that dominated the 1970s, 1980s, and 1990s—especially bands that performed in England's "Monsters of Rock" festivals. The Monsters of Rock paid tribute to bands like Iron Maiden, Judas Priest, Queensryche, Black Sabbath, Ozzy Osbourne and many others.

Monsters of Rock performed in venues within the Southern California area and received a third place award and a $4,000 cash prize in the "Ultimate Music Challenge 2: Battle of the Cover Bands" at Viejas Casino in Alpine, California on August 3, 2008.

Monsters of Rock also competed the following year in the "Ultimate Music Challenge 3: Battle of the Cover Bands" at Viejas Casino in Alpine, California on July 8, 2009 winning second place and a $8,000 cash prize.

History

Monsters of Rock originally formed in February 2005 by bassist Jeff Sheets (formerly of Hunter), lead guitarist Gavin O'Hara (formerly of Sabotage, Street Liegel, and Sinor), drummer A.J. Wolfe, and lead vocalist Ron Lerma (formerly of Piece of Mind, Deeper Purple, and Teabag). Jeff Sheets, Gavin O'Hara, and A.J. Wolfe were all formerly in the band Wolfgaard in 2004 playing originals and covers. The band name was changed from Wolfgaard to Monsters of Rock when Ron Lerma joined the group and suggested the name change. Ron was also involved in an original project with the band Sator Square at the time of Monsters of Rock's formation.

In April 2005, A.J. Wolfe accepted a job offer and relocated to Oregon. He was replaced by Tom Hogue (formerly of Cynical Man and Malady who are presently known as Benedictum and have since released three albums/CDs in Europe). Eventually the band decided that they would need a second guitarist to fill out their sound. After auditioning several candidates, they recruited lead guitarist Sergio Estrada (formerly of Sweet Vengeance) in mid-April 2005.

The members of this line up all brought previous experience having played alongside acts such as Quiet Riot, Ratt, Great White, Motörhead, and others at such legendary San Diego venues as the Bacchanal, Rio's, Straita Head Sound, 4th&B, and Brick by Brick (formerly "The Spirit Club") to name a few. While they were playing original material at these venues in hopes of a recording contract, this time around the purpose of their band was to play heavy metal covers that influenced them to become musicians in the first place.

In May 2006, due to musical differences, Jeff Sheets left the band. Bass player Dave Kendall (formerly of The Spoilers & The Late Edition) joined the band the same month. Dave was a friend of both Tom Hogue and Sergio Estrada dating back to high school. In May 2010, Tom Hogue also left the band.  Tom Hogue was initially replaced by Jerry Fluery (formerly of 6one9  and Black Diamond w/Gavin O'Hara back in 1983). Jerry had to quit the band due to work constraints and was replaced by Sergio's brother, Roger Estrada in September 2010. In May 2014, the band parted ways with lead vocalist, Ron Lerma. After unsuccessful attempts of finding a full-time replacement lead singer, the band decided to utilize other guest lead vocalists to fulfill their contractual obligations for the remainder of 2014. Since all four of the remaining members were currently in three different bands, the Monsters band scaled back to doing quarterly shows between 2015-2017.

Since 2008, the band had been playing venues, such as House of Blues, The Belly Up Tavern, Paladinos, and were a house band at the Second Wind Bars in Santee and San Carlos, CA. They prided themselves in filling a void not too many bands provide which is playing classic heavy metal covers. They shared the stage with many nationally and internationally known tribute and original music acts such as The Iron Maidens, The Atomic Punks, Wild Child, Damage Inc, ThundHerStruck, Lights, Steel Panther, and Pearl Aday to name a few.

The band came to a sudden halt with the untimely and tragic death of one of its long-standing members, Sergio Estrada, on October 1, 2017. The Monsters of Rock band had to cancel their final show, already booked for later in October, when Sergio was first hospitalized in early September 2017.

Members

Gavin O'Hara - Lead Guitar &  backing vocals (2005–2017)
Roger Estrada - Drums (2010–2017)
Sergio Estrada - Lead Guitar &  backing vocals (2005–2017) [RIP]
Dave Kendall - Bass Guitar &  backing vocals (2006–2017)

Former members

Ron Lerma - Lead Vocals (2005–2014)
A.J. Wolfe - Drums (2005)
Jeff Sheets - Bass Guitar &  backing vocals (2005–2006)
Tom Hogue - Drums &  backing vocals (2005–2010)
Jerry Fluery- Drums (2010)

Guest Lead Vocalists

2017 
Shamini Jain (formerly of Up The Irons)
Gary Pacini (Current band: Rammoth)
Greg Rupp (Current band: formerly of 8FIVE8, 6one9)
Michele Whitlow (Current bands: The Big Lewinsky, Up The Irons)

Guest Lead Vocalists

2014-2016 
Lauri Randall Vreeland (formerly of Relax Max)
Tommy Inglehorn 
Trent Slatton (formerly of Hell Bent, Jane's Diction)
Deb DiMaggio (formerly of Get Groovin)
Joey Molina (Current band: Classic Buzz)
Mark Griffin (formerly of Serious Guise)
Mike Griffin (formerly of Serious Guise)

Guest Bassists
John Osmon (Formerly of Relax Max, Deeper Purple)
Jim Mills

References

External Links:

Monsters of Rock MySpace website
Monsters of Rock Facebook website
M.O.R. at Lo-Cal Music website 

Musical groups from San Diego
Heavy metal musical groups from California
Tribute bands